Ophiactis is a genus of brittle stars (Ophiuroidea).

Species

The following species are recognised by the World Register of Marine Species :

Ophiactis abyssicola (M. Sars, 1861)
Ophiactis affinis Duncan, 1879
Ophiactis algicola H.L. Clark, 1933
Ophiactis amator Koehler, 1922
Ophiactis applegatei Martin-Medrano, Thuy & Garcia-Barrera, 2009 †
Ophiactis asperula (Philippi, 1858)
Ophiactis balli (W. Thompson, 1840)
Ophiactis brachyaspis H.L. Clark, 1911
Ophiactis brachygenys H.L. Clark, 1911
Ophiactis brachyura Döderlein, 1898
Ophiactis brasiliensis Manso, 1988
Ophiactis brevis H.L. Clark, 1938
Ophiactis canotia Lyman, 1879
Ophiactis carnea Ljungman, 1867
Ophiactis crosnieri Cherbonnier & Guille, 1978
Ophiactis definita Koehler, 1922
Ophiactis delagoa J.B. Balinsky, 1957
Ophiactis dyscrita H.L. Clark, 1911
Ophiactis flexuosa Lyman, 1879
Ophiactis fuscolineata H.L. Clark, 1938
Ophiactis gymnochora H.L. Clark, 1911
Ophiactis hemiteles H.L. Clark, 1915
Ophiactis hexacantha H.L. Clark, 1939
Ophiactis hirta Lyman, 1879
Ophiactis kroeyeri Lütken, 1856
Ophiactis lethe A.H. Clark, 1949
Ophiactis ljungmani Marktanner-Turneretscher, 1887
Ophiactis loricata Lyman, 1869
Ophiactis luetkeni Marktanner-Turneretscher, 1887
Ophiactis luteomaculata H.L. Clark, 1915
Ophiactis lymani Ljungman, 1872
Ophiactis macrolepidota Marktanner-Turneretscher, 1887
Ophiactis modesta Brock, 1888
Ophiactis muelleri Lütken, 1856
Ophiactis nama Lyman, 1879
Ophiactis nidarosiensis Mortensen, 1920
Ophiactis notabilis H.L. Clark, 1939
Ophiactis perplexa Koehler, 1897
Ophiactis picteti (de Loriol, 1893)
Ophiactis plana Lyman, 1869
Ophiactis profundi Lütken & Mortensen, 1899
Ophiactis quadrispina H.L. Clark, 1915
Ophiactis quinqueradia Ljungman, 1872
Ophiactis resiliens Lyman, 1879
Ophiactis rubropoda Singletary, 1973
Ophiactis savignyi (Müller & Troschel, 1842)
Ophiactis seminuda Mortensen, 1936
Ophiactis simplex (LeConte, 1851)
Ophiactis spinulifera H.L. Clark, 1939
Ophiactis sulcata Kutscher & Jagt, 2000 †
Ophiactis tricolor H.L. Clark, 1928
Ophiactis tyleri Stöhr & Segonzac, 2005
Ophiactis virens (M. Sars, 1857)

References

Ophiactidae
Ophiuroidea genera